Frances Shayle George (1828–1890) was a New Zealand teacher, writer and educationalist. She was born in Clifton, Gloucestershire, England on 20 September 1828, and died in Auckland, New Zealand on 8 September 1890.

Her writings of poetry and essays ranged from dissertations on the importance of education for young women to contributions to Charles Dickens' Household Words on the subject of early settler's life in New Zealand.

References

1829 births
1890 deaths
New Zealand educators
English emigrants to New Zealand
19th-century New Zealand writers
19th-century New Zealand women writers
People from Clifton, Bristol